is a passenger railway station operated by the Takamatsu-Kotohira Electric Railroad in Takamatsu, Kagawa, Japan.  It is operated by the private transportation company Takamatsu-Kotohira Electric Railroad (Kotoden) and is designated station "K08".

Lines
Ichinomiya Station is a statin on the Kotoden Kotohira Line and is located 10.0 km from the opposing terminus of the line at Takamatsu-Chikkō Station.

Layout
The station consists of a side platform and an island platform serving three tracks. The platforms are connected by level crossings. The station is staffed.

Adjacent stations

History
Ichinomiya Station opened on December 21, 1926 as a station of the Kotohira Electric Railway. On November 1, 1943 it became  a station on the Takamatsu Kotohira Electric Railway Kotohira Line due to a company merger. In April 1987, the station building was relocated 336 meters in the direction of Kotoden Kotohira.

Surrounding area
Ichinomiya-ji (83rd temple of the Shikoku pilgrimage)
Tamura Jinja (ichinomiya of Sanuki Province)
Kagawa Prefectural Takamatsu Minami High School

Passenger statistics

See also
 List of railway stations in Japan

References

External links

  

Railway stations in Japan opened in 1926
Railway stations in Takamatsu